William Mould (6 October 1919 – 27 September 1999) was an English footballer who played in the Football League for Stoke City.

Career
Mould signed for Stoke City as a junior in 1936 from local feeder side Summerbank along with Alexander Ormston, but saw his development curtailed by the outbreak of the Second World War. He was seen as a long-term replacement for Arthur Turner and after World War II Mould did indeed displace Turner. During the War, Mould spent time serving with the Royal Artillery in Normandy and also in Belfast with a number of other Stoke teammates during which time they turned out for Linfield.

When the War came to an end, Mould found himself playing at right back due to the emergence of Neil Franklin and although he was reluctant to switch positions he played with great distinction and was handed the captaincy for the end of the 1940s. He played for Stoke until 1952 before joining Crewe Alexandra, after making almost 200 appearances for the "Potters". After two years at Crewe he retired to concentrate on his successful sports outfitters business until his death in 1999.

Career statistics
Source:

References

External links
 Half of great partnership

1919 births
1999 deaths
Footballers from Stoke-on-Trent
English footballers
English Football League players
Stoke City F.C. players
Crewe Alexandra F.C. players
Association football defenders
British Army personnel of World War II
Royal Artillery personnel
Military personnel from Staffordshire